Francis III may refer to:

 Francesco III Ordelaffi (1357–1405)
 Francis III, Duke of Brittany (1518–1536)
 Francesco III Gonzaga, Duke of Mantua (1533–1550)
 Francis I, Holy Roman Emperor, also Francis III, Duke of Lorraine (1708–1765)
 Francesco III d'Este, Duke of Modena (1737–1780)